Avena Township is one of twenty townships in Fayette County, Illinois, USA.  As of the 2010 census, its population was 2,010 and it contained 855 housing units.

Geography

Cities, towns, villages
 St. Elmo

Extinct towns
 Howards Point
 Pruett

Cemeteries
The township contains these five cemeteries: Crums Chapel, Guy, Maplewood, Seidner, Saint Bonaventure and Yolton.

Major highways
  Interstate 70
  U.S. Route 40

Demographics

School districts
 Brownstown Community Unit School District 201
 St Elmo Community Unit School District 202

Political districts
 Illinois's 19th congressional district
 State House District 102
 State Senate District 51

References
 
 United States Census Bureau 2007 TIGER/Line Shapefiles
 United States National Atlas

External links
 City-Data.com
 Illinois State Archives

Townships in Fayette County, Illinois
1859 establishments in Illinois
Populated places established in 1859
Townships in Illinois